The Korea national under-17 basketball team represents South Korea in international basketball competitions. It is governed by the Korea Basketball Association (KBA). It represents the country in international under-17 and under-16 (under age 17 and under age 16) basketball competitions.

See also 
 South Korea national basketball team
 South Korea women's national basketball team
 South Korea national under-19 basketball team

References

Korea, South
Basketball